The 1972 Navy Midshipmen football team represented the United States Naval Academy (USNA) as an independent during the 1972 NCAA University Division football season. The team was led by fourth-year head coach Rick Forzano.

Schedule

Roster

Game summaries

Army
Cleveland Cooper 112 yards rushing

References

Navy
Navy Midshipmen football seasons
Navy Midshipmen football